A monorail (from "mono", meaning "one", and "rail") is a railway in which the track consists of a single rail or a beam. 

Colloquially, the term "monorail" is often used to describe any form of elevated rail or people mover. More accurately, the term refers to the style of track.

Etymology
The term possibly comes from 1897, from German engineer Eugen Langen, who called an elevated railway system with wagons suspended the Eugen Langen One-railed Suspension Tramway (Einschieniges Hängebahnsystem Eugen Langen).

Differentiation from other transport systems

Monorails have found applications in airport transfer and medium capacity metros. To differentiate monorails from other transport modes, the Monorail Society defines a monorail as a "single rail serving as a track for passenger or freight vehicles. In most cases rail is elevated, but monorails can also run at grade, below grade or in subway tunnels. Vehicles either are suspended from or straddle a narrow guide way. Monorail vehicles are wider than the guide way that supports them.”

Similarities
Monorails are often elevated, sometimes leading to confusion with other elevated systems such as the Docklands Light Railway, Vancouver SkyTrain, the AirTrain JFK and cable propelled systems like the Cable Liner people mover which run on two rails.

Monorail vehicles often appear similar to light rail vehicles, and can be staffed or unstaffed. They can be individual rigid vehicles, articulated single units, or multiple units coupled into trains. Like other advanced rapid transit systems, monorails can be driven by linear induction motors; like conventional railways, vehicle bodies can be connected to the beam via bogies, allowing curves to be negotiated.

Monorails are sometimes used in urban areas alongside conventional parallel railed metro systems. Mumbai Monorail serves alongside Mumbai Metro, while monorail lines are integrated with conventional rail lines in Bangkok's BTS Skytrain network.

Differences
Unlike some trams and light rail systems, modern monorails are always separated from other traffic and pedestrians due to the geometry of the rail. They are both guided and supported via interaction with the same single beam, in contrast to other guided systems like rubber-tyred metros, the Sapporo Municipal Subway; or guided buses or trams, such as Translohr. Monorails do not use pantographs.

From the passenger's perspective, monorails can have some advantages over trains, buses, and automobiles. As with other grade-separated transit systems, monorails avoid red lights, intersection turns, and traffic jams. Surface-level trains, buses, automobiles, and pedestrians can collide each one with the other, while vehicles on dedicated, grade-separated rights-of-way such as monorails can collide only with other vehicles on the same system, with much fewer opportunities for collision. As with other elevated transit systems, monorail passengers enjoy sunlight and views and by watching for familiar landmarks, they can know better when to get off to reach their destinations. Monorails can be quieter than diesel buses and trains. They obtain electricity from the track structure, eliminating costly and, to many people, unsightly overhead power lines and poles. Compared to the elevated train systems of New York, Chicago and elsewhere, a monorail beamway casts a narrow shadow. (See 'Chicago "L"' )

Maglev
Under the Monorail Society's beam-width criterion, some, but not all, maglev systems are considered monorails, such as the Transrapid and Linimo. Maglevs differ from other monorails in that they do not physically contact the beam while moving.

History

Early years
The first monorail prototype was made in Russia in 1820 by Ivan Elmanov. Attempts at creating monorail alternatives to conventional railways have been made since the early part of the 19th century.

The Centennial Monorail was featured at the Centennial Exposition in Philadelphia in 1876. Based on its design the Bradford and Foster Brook Railway was built in 1877 and ran for one year from January 1878 until January 1879.

Around 1879 a "one-rail" system was proposed independently by Haddon and by Stringfellow, which used an inverted "V" rail (and thus shaped like "Λ" in cross-section). It was intended for military use, but was also seen to have civilian use as a "cheap railway." Similarly, one of the first systems put into practical use was that of French engineer Charles Lartigue, who built a line between Ballybunion and Listowel in Ireland, opened in 1888 and lasting 36 years, being closed in 1924 (due to damage from Ireland's Civil War). It used a load-bearing single rail and two lower, external rails for balance, the three carried on triangular supports. It was cheap to construct but tricky to operate. Possibly the first monorail locomotive was a 0-3-0 steam locomotive on this line. A high-speed monorail using the Lartigue system was proposed in 1901 between Liverpool and Manchester.

The Boynton Bicycle Railroad was a steam-powered monorail in Brooklyn on Long Island, New York. It ran on a single load-bearing rail at ground level, but with a wooden overhead stabilising rail engaged by a pair of horizontally opposed wheels. The railway operated for only two years beginning in 1890.

The Hotchkiss Bicycle Railroad was a monorail on which a matching pedal bicycle could be ridden. The first example was built between Smithville and Mount Holly, New Jersey, in 1892. It closed in 1897. Other examples were built in Norfolk from 1895 to 1909, Great Yarmouth, and Blackpool, UK from 1896.

1900s–1950s
Early designs used a double-flanged single metal rail alternative to the double rail of conventional railways, both guiding and supporting the monorail car. A surviving suspended version is the oldest still in service system: the Wuppertal monorail in Germany. Also in the early 1900s, Gyro monorails with cars gyroscopically balanced on top of a single rail were tested, but never developed beyond the prototype stage. The Ewing System, used in the Patiala State Monorail Trainways in Punjab, India, relies on a hybrid model with a load-bearing single rail and an external wheel for balance. A highspeed monorail using the Lartigue system was proposed in 1901 between Liverpool and Manchester.

In 1910, the Brennan gyroscopic monorail was considered for use to a coal mine in Alaska. In June 1920, the French Patent Office published FR 503782, by Henri Coanda, on a 'Transporteur Aérien' -Air Carrier. One of the first monorails planned in the United States was in New York City in the early 1930s, scrubbed for an elevated train system.

The first half of the 20th century saw many further proposed designs that either never left the drawing board or remained short-lived prototypes. One of the most interesting projects created on the layout was the ball-bearing train by Nikolai Grigorievich Yarmolchuk. This train moved on spherical wheels with electric motors embedded in them, which were located in semi-circular chutes under a wooden platform (in the full-scale project the trestle would have been concrete). A model train, built to 1/5 scale to test the vehicle concept, was capable of reaching speeds of up to 70 km/h. The full-scale project was expected to reach speeds of up to 300 km/h.

1950s–1980s

In the latter half of the 20th century, monorails had settled on using larger beam- or girder-based track, with vehicles supported by one set of wheels and guided by another. There were designs with vehicles supported, suspended or cantilevered from the beams. In the 1950s the ALWEG straddle design emerged, followed by an updated suspended type, the SAFEGE system. Versions of ALWEG's technology are used by the two largest monorail manufacturers, Hitachi Monorail and Bombardier.

In 1956, the first monorail to operate in the US began test operations in Houston, Texas. Disneyland in Anaheim, California, opened the United States' first daily operating monorail system in 1959. Later during this period, additional monorails were installed at Walt Disney World in Florida, Seattle, and in Japan. Monorails were promoted as futuristic technology with exhibition installations and amusement park purchases, as seen by the legacy systems in use today. However, monorails gained little foothold compared to conventional transport systems. In March 1972, Alejandro Goicoechea-Omar had patent DE1755198 published, on a 'Vertebrate Train', build as experimental track in Las Palmas de Gran Canaria, Spain.
Niche private enterprise uses for monorails emerged, with the emergence of air travel and shopping malls, with shuttle-type systems being built.

Perceptions of monorail as public transport
From 1950 to 1980, the monorail concept may have suffered, as with all public transport systems, from competition with the automobile. At the time, the post-World War II optimism in America was riding high and people were buying automobiles in large numbers due to suburbanization and the Interstate Highway System. Monorails in particular may have suffered from the reluctance of public transit authorities to invest in the perceived high cost of un-proven technology when faced with cheaper mature alternatives. There were also many competing monorail technologies, splitting their case further. One notable example of a public monorail is the AMF Monorail that was used as transportation around the 1964-1965 World's Fair.

This high-cost perception was challenged most notably in 1963 when the ALWEG consortium proposed to finance the construction of a major system in Los Angeles County, California in return for the right of operation. This was turned down by the Los Angeles County Board of Supervisors under pressure from Standard Oil of California and General Motors (which were strong advocates for automobile dependency), and the later subway system faced criticism by famed author Ray Bradbury as it had yet to reach the scale of the proposed monorail.

Several monorails initially conceived as transport systems survive on revenues generated from tourism, benefiting from the unique views offered from the largely elevated installations.

Recent history

From the 1980s, most monorail mass transit systems are in Japan, with a few exceptions. Tokyo Monorail, is one of the world's busiest, averages 127,000 passengers per day and has served over 1.5 billion passengers since 1964. China recently started development of monorails in the late 2000s, already home to the world's largest and busiest monorail system and has a number of mass transit monorails under construction in several of cities. A Bombardier Innovia Monorail-based system is under construction in Wuhu and several "Cloudrail" systems developed by BYD under construction a number of cities such as Guang'an, Liuzhou, Bengbu and Guilin. Monorails have seen continuing use in niche shuttle markets and amusement parks.

Modern mass transit monorail systems use developments of the ALWEG beam and tire approach, with only two suspended types in large use. Monorail configurations have also been adopted by maglev trains. Since the 2000s, with the rise of traffic congestion and urbanization, there has been a resurgence of interest in the technology for public transport with a number of cities, such as Malta and Istanbul, today investigating monorails as a possible mass transit solution.

In 2004, Chongqing Rail Transit in China adopted a unique ALWEG-based design with rolling stock that is much wider than most monorails, with capacity comparable to heavy rail. This is because Chongqing is criss-crossed by numerous hills, mountains and rivers, therefore tunneling is not feasible except in some cases (for example, lines 1 and 6) due to the extreme depth involved. Today it is the largest and busiest monorail system in the world.

São Paulo, Brazil is building two high-capacity monorail lines as part of its public transportation network. Other significant monorail systems are under construction such as two lines for the Cairo Monorail, two lines for the MRT (Bangkok) and the SkyRail Bahia in Brazil.

Types and technical aspects

Modern monorails depend on a large solid beam as the vehicles' running surface. There are a number of competing designs divided into two broad classes, straddle-beam and suspended monorails. A rubber-tired carriage contacts the beam on the top and both sides for traction and to stabilize the vehicle. The style was popularized by the German company ALWEG. There is also a historical type of suspension monorail developed by German inventors Nicolaus Otto and Eugen Langen in the 1880s. It was built in the twin cities of Barmen and Elberfeld in Wuppertal, Germany, opened in 1901, and is still in operation. The Chiba Urban Monorail is the world's largest suspended network.

Power
Almost all modern monorails are powered by electric motors fed by dual third rails, contact wires or electrified channels attached to or enclosed in their guidance beams, but diesel-powered monorail systems also exist. Historically some systems, such as the Lartigue Monorail, used steam locomotives.

Magnetic levitation

Magnetic levitation train (maglev) systems such as the German Transrapid were built as straddle-type monorails. However, it is argued that the larger width of the guideway for the maglevs makes it not legitimate to be called monorails.

Switching

Some early monorails (notably the suspended monorail at Wuppertal, Germany) have a design that makes it difficult to switch from one line to another. Some other monorails avoid switching as much as possible by operating in a continuous loop or between two fixed stations, as in the Seattle Center Monorail.

Current monorails are capable of more efficient switching than in the past. With suspended monorails, switching may be accomplished by moving flanges inside the beamway to shift trains to one line or another.

Straddle-beam monorails require that the beam moves for switching, which was an almost prohibitively ponderous procedure. Now the most common way of achieving this is to place a moving apparatus on top of a sturdy platform capable of bearing the weight of vehicles, beams and its own mechanism. Multiple-segmented beams move into place on rollers to smoothly align one beam with another to send the train in its desired direction, with the design originally developed by ALWEG capable of completing a switch in 12 seconds. Some of these beam turnouts are quite elaborate, capable of switching between several beams or simulating a railroad double-crossover. Vehicle specifications are generally not open to the public, as is standard for rolling stock built for public services  

An alternative to using a wye or other form of switch, is to use a turntable, where a car sits upon a section of track that can be reoriented to several different tracks. For example, this can be used to switch a car from being in a storage location, to being on the main line. The now-closed Sydney Monorail had a traverser at the depot, which allowed a train on the main line to be exchanged with another from the depot. There were about six lines in the depot, including one for maintenance.

Grades
Rubber-tired monorails are typically designed to cope with a 6% grade. Rubber-tired light rail or metro lines can cope with similar or greater grades - for example, the Lausanne Metro has grades of up to 12% and the Montreal Metro up to 6.5%, while VAL systems can handle 7% grades.

Monorail systems

Manufacturers of monorail rolling stock with operating systems include Hitachi Monorail, BYD, Bombardier Transportation (now Alstom), PBTS (a joint venture of CRRC Nanjing Puzhen & Bombardier), Intamin and EMTC.

Other developers include CRRC Qingdao Sifang, China Railway Science and Industry Group, Zhongtang Air Rail Technology, Woojin and SkyWay Group.

Records
Busiest line: Line 3, Chongqing Rail Transit, 682,800 passengers per day (2014 Daily Avg.)
Largest system: Chongqing Rail Transit (Lines 2 & 3), 
Longest straddle-beam line: Line 3, Chongqing Rail Transit, or  if the Jurenba branch is included
Largest suspended system: Chiba Urban Monorail, 
Longest maglev line: Shanghai Maglev Train, 
Oldest line still in service: Schwebebahn Wuppertal, 1901

In popular culture

François Truffaut's 1966 film adaptation of Ray Bradbury's novel Fahrenheit 451 contains suspended monorail exterior scenes filmed at the French SAFEGE test track in Châteauneuf-sur-Loire near Orléans, France (since dismantled).

The Thunderbirds February 1966 episode "Brink of Disaster" is about the financing and building of a high speed driverless cross-country monorail project. Two of the Thunderbirds find themselves trapped on board the a monorail train, and with no possibility of escape, when it is discovered it is speeding towards a stricken bridge.

The James Bond film franchise features monorails in three movies, all belonging to the villain. In You Only Live Twice (1967) there is a working ground level monorail inside the SPECTRE volcano base. During Live and Let Die (1973), a prop monorail is shown in the villain's lair on the fictional Caribbean island of San Monique. In the 1977 The Spy Who Loved Me there is working monorail on the villain's supertanker (submarine dock).

In 1987, Lego released a monorail among the Futuron Space line. Despite being the most expensive Lego set of its time (due to being massive and including electrical elements), it was very popular, with Lego releasing a Town themed monorail in 1990 and another Space monorail in 1994 among the Unitron line, as well as additional track. The monorail system was also prominent in the unreleased Seatron Space line and prototype Wild West sets. Its popularity has still endured over thirty years later, where Lego has paid homage in promotional sets and fans have manufactured compatible components.

The fourth season of the American animated television show The Simpsons features the episode "Marge vs. the Monorail", in which the town of Springfield impulsively purchases a faulty monorail from a confidence trickster at a wildly inflated price. The Monorail Society, an organization with 14,000 members worldwide, has blamed the episode for sullying the reputation of monorails, to which Simpsons creator Matt Groening responded "That's a by-product of our viciousness...Monorails are great, so it makes me sad, but at the same time if something's going to happen in The Simpsons, it's going to go wrong, right?"

The 2005 feature film Batman Begins features a monorail, constructed by Bruce Wayne's father through Gotham City, that is part of the climax of the film. The monorail is also included in the spin-off video game.

Blaine the Mono is a train featured in Stephen King's The Dark Tower series of books and first appears in The Dark Tower III: The Waste Lands.

Monorails have also appeared in a number of other video games including Transport Tycoon (since 1999), Japanese Rail Sim 3D: Monorail Trip to Okinawa by Sonic Powered, SimCity 4: Rush Hour, Cities in Motion 2, Cities: Skylines in the Mass transit expansion pack of 2017, Planet Zoo and a non-operating monorail system in the 2020 Cyberpunk 2077

Farm, mining and logistics applications

Monorails have been used for number of applications other than passenger transportation. Small suspended monorail are also widely used in factories either as part of moveable assembly lines.

History 
Inspired by the Centennial Monorail demonstrated in 1876, in 1877 the Bradford and Foster Brook Railway began construction of a  line connecting Bradford and Foster Township, McKean County in Pennsylvania. The line operated from 1878 until 1879 delivering machinery and oil supplies. The first twin-boiler locomotive wore out quickly. It was replaced by a single boiler locomotive which was too heavy and crashed through the track on its third trip. The third locomotive again had twin boilers. On a trial run one of the boilers ran dry and exploded, killing six people. The railway was closed soon after.

Monorails in Central Java were used to transport timber from the forests of Central Java located in the mountains to the rivers. In 1908 and 1909, the forester H. J. L. Beck built a manually operated monorail of limited but sufficient capacity for the transport of small timber and firewood in the Northern Surabaya forest district. In later years, this idea was further developed by L. A. van de Ven, who was a forester in the Grobogan forest district around 1908–1910. Monorails were built by plantation operators and wood processing companies throughout the mountains of Central Java. In 1919/1920, however, the hand-operated monorails gradually disappeared and were replaced by narrow-gauge railways with steam locomotives as forest utilization changed.

In the 1920s the Port of Hamburg used a petrol powered, suspended monorail to transport luggage and freight from ocean-going vessels to a passenger depot.

In the northern Mojave desert, the Epsom Salts Monorail was built in 1924. It ran for 28 miles from a connection on the Trona Railway, eastward to harvest epsomite deposits in the Owlshead Mountains. This Lartigue type monorail achieved gradients of up to ten percent. It only operated until June 1926, when the mineral deposits become uneconomic, and was dismantled for scrap in the late 1930s.

In the Soviet Union the Lyskovsky monorail in the Nizhny Novgorod region was designed by the engineer of the timber industry Ivan Gorodtsov. Following this example a separate  cargo-and-passenger monorail was built from the town of Bor to the village of Zavrazhnoe, where forest and peat were exploited. The Lyskovsky monorail stopped operating in 1949.

The first system was sold in 1949 and it was used in industrial, construction and agricultural applications around the world. The company ceased trading in 1967. The system was adapted for the use in the James Bond film You Only Live Twice. An example of the system exists at the Amberley Museum & Heritage Centre in Britain.

Recent applications 

Very small and light weight systems are used widely on farms to transport crops such as bananas. First developed in Japan, industrial versions of slope cars are used in agriculture in steep sloped areas such as citrus orchards in Japan and vineyards in Italy. One European manufacturer says they have installed 650 systems worldwide.

In the mining industry suspended monorails have been used because of their ability to descend and climb steep tunnels using rack and pinion drive. This significantly reduces cost and length of tunnels, by up to 60% in some cases, which otherwise must be at gentle gradients to suit road vehicles or conventional railways.

A suspended monorail capable of carrying fully loaded 20' and 40' containers has been under construction since 2020 at the Port of Qingdao, the first phase of which was put into operation in 2021.

See also
List of monorail systems
Suspension railway
Bennie Railplane
Hotchkiss Bicycle Railroad
Lartigue Monorail
Monorail plan for the Los Angeles River, California
Rail transport in Walt Disney Parks and Resorts
Slope car / Monorackbahn
Bombardier Innovia Monorail

Notes

References

External links

Schwebebahn  Monorail in Wuppertal, Germany
Monorail Monorail in Sydney, Australia
Minirail at the Expo 67
Innovative Transportation Technologies - a website for the Transportation engineering and Urban planning programs at the University of Washington
The Disneyland Monorail - Article on how a rubber-wheeled monorail works.
The Monorail Society - home page of a volunteer organization promoting monorails, with over 600 separate pages including News Briefs, a World List and a Technical Section
"One-Track Wonders: Early Monorails" - Site with many images of imagined and real monorails
The unknown Russian monorail (translated to English)
Maglev Monorail - Official site of the International Maglev Board
Walt Disney World's Monorail
The American Monorail Project - a website dedicated to making the public aware of the benefits of modern monorail systems particularly when compared to other much more expensive forms of mass transit

 
Magnetic propulsion devices
Russian inventions
Articles containing video clips